are Austrian, German, Swiss, Czech, Slovak, Polish and Hungarian small, crescent-shaped biscuits. They were originally made with walnuts, but almonds or hazelnuts can also be used. They get their typical flavour from a heavy dusting of vanilla sugar.

Origins

 originate from Vienna in Austria and are traditionally made at Christmas. They are very well known in Europe and are often for sale in Viennese coffee shops. They are said to have been created in the shape of the Turkish crescent moon symbolizing the celebration of the victory over the Turkish in 1683.

They are also widely baked in Germany and are common in Switzerland, Hungary, Poland, Croatia, Czech Republic, Romania, and Slovakia as a part of the typical Christmas baking. Since Advent in Germany is celebrated by several denominations of Christianity on the four Sundays preceding Christmas, many kinds of biscuits and sweets are consumed during this time and have become typical for winter.

Unlike other pastries, this particular kind is difficult to bake. The batter used when hardened is very fragile.

See also 

 Austrian cuisine
 Hungarian cuisine
 Kifli
 Croissant
 Cronut
 Kue putri salju

References

External links
Vanillekipferl

Christmas in Germany
Christmas food
Biscuits
Austrian confectionery
German confectionery
Austrian cuisine
German cuisine
German desserts
Hungarian desserts
Almond cookies